The Trinidad Government Railway existed between 1876 and 28 December 1968.  Originally built to connect Port of Spain with Arima, the railway was extended to Couva in 1880, San Fernando in 1882, Cunapo (now Sangre Grande) in 1897, Tabaquite in 1898, Siparia in 1913 and Rio Claro in 1914.

Background 

The first attempt to establish a railway was a private affair in 1846 by the Trinidad Railway Company. Trinidad Railway Company's very first steam locomotive was the "Forerunner" which was built by Hunslet of Leeds and arrived in 1864.

Railway construction began in the 1870s. The Arima line was completed in 1876, followed by the San Fernando line in 1882. The railway to Princes Town was completed in 1884. These were followed by railway lines to Sangre Grande in 1897 and Cunupia-Tabaquite in 1898.

Overview 
At this, its greatest extent, the railway covered .

After the end of World War I, the appearance of the automobile led to changes that culminated with the phased closure of the railway April 1953 and 28 December 1968 saw the complete closure of the Trinidad Government Railways.

Statistics 

By the end of 1921 the company owned 37 steam locomotives, 105 coaches and 738 goods wagons. In 1931, a Sentinel-Cammell twin articulated steam railcar was acquired. By 1936, there were 29 locomotives, 1 railcar, 82 coaches and 925 goods wagons.

Stations 

The principal stations, termini and junctions were:

 Port of Spain – terminus, capital and port
 Tunapuna – junction in east
 Sangre Grande – terminus in east
 Tunapuna – junction in east
 Chaguanas – junction in north central
 Rio Claro – terminus in south east
 Chaguanas – junction in north central
 Couva – station in west central
 Gasparillo – station
 Princes Town – terminus
 Claxton Bay – station in south central
 Marabella – junction in south west
 San Fernando – station in south west
 Penal – station in south
 Siparia – terminus in south

New railway 
On 11 April 2008 the Trinitrain consortium was chosen to plan and build two new Trinidad Rapid Railway passenger lines. This plan was cancelled in 2010.

References 

Rail transport in Trinidad and Tobago
Standard gauge railways in Trinidad